Biliga-Mossi is a town in the Nassere Department of Bam Province in northern Burkina Faso. It has a population of 2436.

References

Populated places in the Centre-Nord Region
Bam Province